Mónica Randall (born 1942) is a Spanish film actress.

Randall has made some 110 appearances in film and TV since 1963. She appeared in numerous Spaghetti Westerns in the 1960s in films such as One Hundred Thousand Dollars for Ringo and has made regular TV appearances since the 1970s.

Selected filmography
 The Troublemaker (1963)
 Z7 Operation Rembrandt (1966)
 Killer 77, Alive or Dead (1966)
 Cristina Guzmán (1968)
 A Decent Adultery  (1969)
 The Troublemaker (1969)
 Red Sun (1971)
 The Witches Mountain (1972)
 La cruz del diablo (1975)
 Inquisition (1976)
 Cría Cuervos (1976)

References

External links and sources 
 

Spanish film actresses
1942 births
Living people
Spaghetti Western actresses
20th-century Spanish actresses